Imathia Province was one of the provinces of the Imathia Prefecture, Greece. Its territory corresponded with that of the current municipalities Alexandreia and Veroia. It was abolished in 2006.

References

Provinces of Greece
Imathia